Ivan Vukadinov (born 19 March 1932)  is a Bulgarian painter.  Considered “one of the greatest of Bulgarian artists,” he is a featured as one of the 25 artists since the nineteenth century selected for the definitive monograph series published by the National Endowment of the Arts. Vukadinov has resurrected a specific encaustic technique used in ancient Egypt for making Fayyum mummy portraits and is renowned for his clean emblematic shapes and minimalist compositions with contemplative references to Etruscan, Egyptian, Thracian, Greek and Roman art.

Career
Vukadinov originally trained in plein-air landscapes and still-lifes, but his style soon style changed to a minimalism of expression, dense coloration and a Figurative Constructivist approach to explore the confluent influences of the past on present consciousness and national aesthetics.

Following an exhibition in Rome, the purchase of two paintings by the Vatican was blocked by the Bulgarian government on the grounds that Vukadinov paintings are “a National treasure.” He was honored by the city of Pisa, which presented him with the Key to the City of Pisa. Subsequently, Vukadinov was offered a professorship in Rome, however, he refused the prestigious position in order not to create political problems for his family. 

He was the subject of books by National Museum of Bulgarian Art in 1978 and by the National Endowment for the Arts in 2015, which characterized his mature style in the following terms: “By incorporating the fourth dimension in his pictures — that of time — the artist transforms spatial dynamics into flat statics through which his works elicit a sense of timelessness, linking him with both Egyptian aesthetics and mediaeval symbolism.” In his painting cycles Matter and Time I and II, for example, Vukadinov used the motifs of the Egyptian mirror and of Coptic or Mayan textiles to express the eternity of spiritual values.

Following his exposure to the teaching of Nenko Balkanski at the National Academy of Arts in Sofia (1961-1964), Vukadinov’s style changed from simple plain-air landscapes and still-lifes to a minimalism of expression, dense coloration and a Figurative Constructivist approach to the composition as he explored the intangible confluent influences of the past on present consciousness and national aesthetics.

Biography

Vukadinov trained at the National Academy of Arts in Sofia as a student of Professor Nenko Balkanski (1961-1964) and lives in Sofia, Bulgaria. By 1963 his work was shown in group art exhibitions in Bulgaria, and internationally in Russia, Latvia, France, England, Italy, and Austria. He had solo exhibitions at Rakovski 125 Gallery, in Sofia, now 'Rajko Aleksiev’, and at Margutina Gallery in Rome in 1975. They were followed by joint exhibitions with Olga Belopitova in 1977-8 at the Museum of Fine Arts in Grosseto, the Palazzo Gambacorti in Pisa, and Wittgenstein House in Vienna.  He also had two exhibitions at Rakovski 125 Gallery, one in 1980 and an annual exhibition from 2006-14 together with Ivan Kirkov, Ivan Stoilov (Bunkera), Ivan Dimov, Ivan Andonov, Ivan Milev, Ivan Ninov, and Ivan Raney.

Selected works
 Portrait of Juliana (1960)
 Knight’s Move (1970)
 Interior with Etruscan Hunting Dog (1970)
 In Memory of Heroes (1971)
 Sugar Factory (1976)
 Stone Walls (1976)
 Blue Fish (1980)
 Golden Chess (1980)
 Matter and Time cycle (1976-1980)
 Mediaeval Bulgaria cycle (1976-1979) 
 Earth Fault (1990)
 Harvest (~2005)

Further reading
D. Chulov, Ivan Vukadinov, in 'Choice. 43 Connoisseurs - 43 Works of Art', SGHG, Sofia, May-August 2001, 84-85.
A. Dtweva, Exhibition of Olga Belopitova and Ivan Vukadinov, Literaturen Front, 24 July 1981.
A. Dzhurova. Ivan Vukadinov. Narodna Kultura, 22 February 1975.
A. Dzhurova, Exhibition Ivan Vukadinov, Izkustvo, 5, 1975, 28-30.
A. Dzhurova, Ivan Vukadinov, presented by A. Dzhurova. Balgarski Khudozhnik: Sofia. 1978. 28 p., 16 p. plates.
N. Migeli. II Tereno, 3 February 1978.

References

External links
 Ivan Vukadinov at Gallery Rakurski
 Ivan Vukadinov paintings – P. Chakarova

1932 births
Bulgarian painters
Living people